"I Love Your Smile" is a song by American singer-songwriter Shanice, released in October 1991 as the lead single from her second studio album, Inner Child (1991). The song features a saxophone solo by Branford Marsalis as well as laughter from Janet Jackson and René Elizondo Jr. near the end of the song. It was produced by Narada Michael Walden, and the radio version of the song removes the rap bridge from the album version. To date, "I Love Your Smile" is Shanice's best known and most successful hit. 

It peaked at number two on the US Billboard Hot 100, and it topped the Billboard Hot R&B/Hip-Hop Singles & Tracks chart for 4 weeks in December 1991 and January 1992. In Europe, "I Love Your Smile" peaked at number two on the UK Singles Chart after being remixed by Driza Bone and reached the top of the Dutch Top 40 in the Netherlands. In 1992, it was nominated for a Grammy Award for Best Female R&B Vocal Performance. Shanice performed the song as the first musical guest on The Tonight Show with Jay Leno on May 25, 1992. A music video was produced to promote the single, featuring Shanice in a studio having pictures taken by a photographer.

Critical reception
AllMusic editor Tim Griggs named "I Love Your Smile" a "standout" from Inner Child. J.D. Considine from The Baltimore Sun felt that here, Narada Michael Walden "gets a knock-out performance" from Shanice. He added that her "sunny delivery, backed by a breezy, Euro-pop arrangement and a rock-steady appearance by saxophonist Branford Marsalis, makes this the kind of tune you wouldn't expect from anyone still in Clearasil's primary target group." Larry Flick from Billboard described it as a "slinky R&B tune", remarking that Shanice's "matured voice sounds like a cross between Chaka Khan and Janet Jackson, sprawling out comfortably over a subtle and percussive groove that is framed with warm sax lines." DeVaney and Clark from Cashbox stated, "Compared to her previous projects, you can clearly tell that Wilson has matured both musically and vocally to take this project to its limits." Martin Johnson from Chicago Reader  declared it "an ideal guilty pleasure". A reviewer from Ealing Leader found that "this little bundle of dynamite shows great promise with a warm debut single." Swedish Expressen noted its "whispering happy jingle". 

Dave Sholin from the Gavin Report wrote, "Only in her teens, Shanice Wilson is anything but a newcomer, having arrived on the scene in the late eighties and scoring instant airplay. But this should be the effort that really sparks her career." Lakeland Ledger described her voice as "playful and spunky". Alan Jones from Music Weeks RM Dance Update declared it as "a likeable and highly commercial pop/dance workout, [and] it will doubtless be a hit on both sides of the Atlantic." Another editor, James Hamilton, called it a "delightful breathily gurgling, humming, whistling, tinkling and (Branford Marsalis's jazz sax) tooting jiggly jogging cheerful swayer". A reviewer from People Magazine stated that it "has risen to the top of the R&B charts on its jaunty, literally bells-and-whistles riff, its jazzy a cappella refrain and a walloping beat." Michael Eric Dyson from Rolling Stone viewed it as "a sparkling midtempo confession of love" framed by Marsalis' sax. Mark Frith from Smash Hits praised it as an "infectious swingbeat tune", giving it four out of five. Jonathan Bernstein from Spin felt that Shanice "brought sheer, unalloyed joy to the charts and our hearts with her "I Love Your Smile". Exuberance isn't a feature of too many records these days—maybe some Helmet, the early stuff—but this singer sounded giddy with delight on her hit."

Impact and legacy
Polish Porcys ranked "I Love Your Smile" number 46 in their list of "100 Singles 1990–1999" in 2012, writing, "The career of the singer did not flourish somehow stunning, but this one song, this one "turutututururu" is immortal. This sweet chorus has probably one of the most naturally catchy melodies of all time." 

Track listings

 7-inch single "I Love Your Smile" (radio version) – 3:46
 "I Love Your Smile" (instrumental) – 4:14

 7-inch single—Driza Bone remix "I Love Your Smile" (Driza Bone single remix) – 3:50
 "I Love Your Smile" (original version) – 3:46

 CD single 1 "I Love Your Smile" (radio version) – 3:46
 "I Love Your Smile" (extended version) – 4:14
 "I Love Your Smile" (instrumental) – 4:14

 CD single 2'''
 "I Love Your Smile" (Driza Bone single remix)
 "I Love Your Smile" (Driza Bone club mix)
 "I Love Your Smile" (Driza Bone dub mix)
 "I Love Your Smile" (original single version)

Personnel
 All vocals and rap by Shanice Wilson
 Drums and programming by Narada Michael Walden
 Keyboards, drum programming, programming and synthesized bass by Louis Biancaniello
 Saxophone solo by Branford Marsalis
 Background vocals by Alyssa Lala, Crystal Wilson, David A. Miguel, Jack McAdoo, David Lee, Diamond D, Eric Daniels, Jarvis La Rue Baker, Kathy Horton, Label Atkinson, Lisa Walden, Mike Mani

Charts

Weekly charts

Year-end charts

Release history

Cover versions
 Shirley Kwan covered the song in Cantonese in 1992 for her album "製造迷夢".
 Dutch R&B group duo R'n'G covered the song in 1998 for a tribute album "Hands on Motown". 
 Tiffany Evans covered the song in 2004 for her self-titled first EP. 
 Kaori Kobayashi covered the song in 2005 for her debut album Solar, Kaori's Collection.
 Talib Kweli referenced the song in his song "Hot Thing" from his 2007 album, Eardrum.
 Jakob Elvstrøm covered the song in 2009 for his album "SaxClub vol.1".
 The song was sampled by Zimbabwean artist Rockford Josphat 'Roki' in his track "Zuva neZuva" which featured SK and Pauline.
 Japanese jazz singer meg covered the song in 2015 on her album "meglution".''
 Goblin Cock covered the song in 2018 for the album "Roses on the Piano"
 Sections of the song were interpolated in Chris Brown's 2019 single "Undecided".
 The song was sampled by UK artist HRVY for his 2021 single "Runaway with it".
 The song was sampled by British pop group Jamiroquai in the 1993 song "Too Young to Die", with interpolated chorus. 
 The song was sampled by Serbian pop-dance group Moby Dick in the 1995 song "Ne reci mi", with interpolated intro.

See also
 List of number-one R&B singles of 1991 (U.S.)
 List of number-one R&B singles of 1992 (U.S.)
 Dutch Top 40 number-one hits of 1992

References

1991 songs
1991 singles
1992 singles
Dutch Top 40 number-one singles
Motown singles
Number-one singles in Zimbabwe
Shanice songs
Song recordings produced by Narada Michael Walden
Songs written by Narada Michael Walden
Songs written by Shanice